Spanish North Africa may refer to:

Contemporary Spanish North Africa:
Spain's two autonomous cities: Ceuta and Melilla, plus other minor territories (plazas de soberanía)
Canary Islands
Historical Spanish North Africa (1913–1975); former Spanish colonies in Northern Africa, part of the Plazas y Provincias Africanas:
Spanish Morocco
Spanish Sahara
Ifni
Cape Juby

See also
Spanish Africa (disambiguation)
Spanish West Africa
Ceuta and Melilla (disambiguation)
Languages of Africa